Makhosi Busisiwe Khoza is a South African politician who was the ActionSA candidate for Mayor of eThekwini in the 2021 municipal elections. She was previously an ANC Member of Parliament (MP) who served as chairperson of the Portfolio Committee on Public Service and Administration and on the Portfolio Committee on Economic Development. She became known for calling on then president Jacob Zuma to step down.

Education

She holds a PhD in Public Administration and a master's degree in Social Science (Policy and Developmental Studies) from the University of Witwatersrand. She is also a fellow at the Aspen Global Leadership Institute.

Resignation from the ANC

Having experience within both public and private sectors, Khoza served in the Portfolio Committee on Economic Development as a member of Parliament from the 4 September 2017 to the 21 September of that same year. Additionally, she is a former member of the African National Congress, National Assembly, and AdHoc Committee to nominate a person for the post of Public Protector.
On 21 September 2017, Khoza announced her resignation from the ANC to join the effort against corruption in South Africa.

On 1 December 2017, Khoza announced that she would launch a new political party, named African Democratic Change to be made of up of 16 small political groups. Khoza resigned from the African Democratic Change on 22 April 2018.

Ubantu isiZulu Alphabetical language

Khoza is the creator of an alphabetical language ordering system that helps in the learning of the Zulu language. Khoza published a textbook that works to build a solid foundation of South African linguistic identity through the presenting of a new sound-unit sequencing, Ubantu isiZulu Alphabetical Logic Order (UZALO). Her textbook acts as a guide and practical bilingual tool that could be utilized into various other Bantu languages.

References

African National Congress politicians
Creators of writing systems
Living people
South African politicians
1970 births
ActionSA politicians